Thomas H. Digges (died June 6, 1887) was a state representative during the Reconstruction era in Alabama. He represented Barbour County. He worked as a field hand.

See also
List of African-American officeholders during Reconstruction

References

People from Barbour County, Alabama
19th-century American politicians
African-American state legislators in Alabama
African-American politicians during the Reconstruction Era
Year of birth missing
1887 deaths